Jowzuiyeh or Juzuiyeh may refer to:
 Juzuiyeh, Baft, Kerman Province (جوزوييه - Jūzūīyeh)
 Jowzuiyeh, Jiroft, Kerman Province (جوزوئيه - Jowzū’īyeh)
 Jowzuiyeh, Zarand, Kerman Province (جوزوييه - Jowzūīyeh)